Turkic peoples have historically been associated as one of the non-indigenous peoples to have ruled areas of the Indian subcontinent. Modern day Turkish people in India, on the other hand, are very small in number, and are recent immigrants from Turkey. In the 1961 census, 58 people stated that their mother tongue was Turkish. According to the 2001 census, 126 residents of India stated their place of birth as Turkey. In a state visit during early 2010, Prime Minister Abdullah Gül of Turkey met Turkish expatriates living in India and handed out Hindi-Turkish dictionaries to Turkish students in New Delhi.

History and origin

The first known mention of the term Turk applied to a Turkic group was in reference to the Göktürks in the 6th century, who were based in modern Mongolia. Over time, the term has devolved onto the Turks of modern day Turkey, but historically was also used to describe Central Asian Turkic groups. The Turk biradari claim their descent from the latter group, Turks of Rohilkhand and the Terai region. One such tradition claims that the Turks came to India as soldiers who accompanied the 11th century warrior-saint Ghazi Saiyyad Salar Masud or Ghazi Miyan (circa 1014 – 1034 CE).  The Turk settlement took place at a latter date. Indeed some Turks groups, particularly those in Rampur, that are originally emigrants from Central Asia, and came in the army of Alauddin Khalji, Shahabddin Ghori & Amir Timur lane. These Turks had come from Turkistan region in what is now Central Asia.

Present circumstances

The Turks live in northern India, mainly in Delhi, Gaziabad, Amroha, Moradabad, Rampur, Sambhal, Bijnor, Muzaffarnagar and Meerut in Uttar Pradesh, Udhamsingh Nagar, Nainital and Haldwani  in Kumaon, Bhopal and Junagarh in Gujarat and in South India mainly in the city of Hyderabad in Telangana, Bidar, Gulbarga, Bijapur, Mysore, Srirangapatna of Karnataka, Banganapalle, Kurnool of Andhra Pradesh, Arcot, Tamil Nadu, Pathanamthitta, Erattupetta, Palakkad district, Alappuzha district in Kerala.

The community had traditionally served as soldiers in the armies of the various princely states in the Kathiawar Agency. They are also good traders Like other Gujarati Muslims, they have a caste association known as the Jamat, which acts both as a welfare organization and an instrument of social control.

Notable people

Timurid dynasty
 
Ghaznavid dynasty
 
Taj al-Din Yildiz, general of the Delhi Sultanate
 
Mamluk dynasty of Delhi
 
Shah Turkan, mistress of Iltutmish
 
Malik Altunia, consort of Razia Sultan
 
Muhammad bin Bakhtiyar Khalji, general of the Delhi Sultanate
 
Muhammad Shiran Khalji, the 2nd governor of Bengal (Lakhnauti) under the Delhi Sultanate
 
Iwaz Khalji, the 3rd governor of Bengal (Lakhnauti) under the Delhi Sultanate
 
Ali Mardan Khalji, the 3rd governor of Bengal (Lakhnauti) under the Delhi Sultanate
 
Malik Balkha Khalji, the last Khalji governor of Bengal (Lakhnauti) under the Delhi Sultanate
 
Saifuddin Aibak, 1st governor of Bengal (Lakhnauti) under the Mamluk Delhi Sultanate
 
Awar Khan Aibak, 2nd governor of Bengal (Lakhnauti) under the Mamluk Delhi Sultanate
 
Tughral Tughan Khan, 3rd governor of Bengal (Lakhnauti) under the Mamluk Delhi Sultanate
 
Tughlaq Tamar Khan, 4th governor of Bengal (Lakhnauti) under the Mamluk Delhi Sultanate
 
Malik Ikhtiyaruddin Iuzbak, 6th governor of Bengal (Lakhnauti) under the Mamluk Delhi Sultanate
 
Ijjauddin Balban Iuzbaki, 7th governor of Bengal (Lakhnauti) under the Mamluk Delhi Sultanate
 
Nasiruddin Bughra Khan, 13th governor of Bengal (Lakhnauti) under the Mamluk Delhi Sultanate
 
Rukunuddin Kaikaus, 1st governor of Bengal (Lakhnauti) under the Balban Delhi Sultanate
 
Shamsuddin Firuz Shah, 2nd governor of Bengal (Lakhnauti) under the Balban Delhi Sultanate
 
Ghiyasuddin Bahadur Shah, 3rd governor of Bengal (Lakhnauti) under the Balban Delhi Sultanate
 
Izz al-Din Yahya, 6th governor of Bengal (Lakhnauti) under the Tughlaq Delhi Sultanate
 
Munim Khan, 1st Mughal Subahdar of Bengal Subah
 
Khan Jahan I, 2nd Mughal Subahdar of Bengal Subah
 
Jahangir Quli Beg, Mughal Subahdar of Bengal Subah
 
Nasir ad-Din Qabacha, Governor of Multan
 
Khalji dynasty
 
Tughlaq dynasty
 
Qutb Shahi dynasty

Ghazi ud-Din Khan Feroze Jung III, 1st Nawab of Baoni State

Dürrüşehvar Sultan, Imperial Princess of the Ottoman Empire wife of prince Azam Jah
 
Princess Niloufer, Princess of the Ottoman Empire wife of prince Moazzam Jah
 
Princess Esra, wife of Mukarram Jah, 8th Nizam of Hyderabad
 
Manolya Onur, wife of Mukarram Jah, 8th Nizam of Hyderabad
 
Muhammad Beg Khan-e Rosebahani, was Qiladar and Jagirdar of Banganapalle
 
Nawabs of Banganapalle
 
Rulers of Amb State

Jackie Shroff, Indian actor

See also 
Indians in Turkey
India–Turkey relations
Turks in Pakistan
Turk Jamat
Rowther

References 

India
India
Ethnic groups in India
Turks
Muslim communities of India